We Are Here World Tour, also known as Monsta X World Tour: We Are Here, is the third worldwide concert tour by the South Korean boy group Monsta X following their successful and sold out world tour for the previous year The Connect World Tour. The tour started on April 13, two months after the release of the group's second Korean-language studio album Take.2 We Are Here, kicking off in Seoul, and then visiting twelve more countries including Thailand, Australia, Malaysia, Spain, Netherlands, France, United Kingdom, Germany, Brazil, Mexico, United States, and Japan.

Background

Asia
In March, their third world tour was announced, including eighteen cities, having the first show held in Seoul at the SK Olympic Handball Gymnasium located at Seoul Olympic Park on April 13 and 14. On March 13, Starship Entertainment revealed that the tickets for their two days Seoul concert had sold out within seventy seconds upon the release on March 12 for four consecutive years.

Before the concert on June 1 in Bangkok, the group held a press conference, in front of the local media in Thailand, and delivered some news about their album activities, their third world tour, and their plans for the future. About seventy media outlets, including some of the local TV, newspapers, magazines, and internet news, gathered at the press conference room to cover their world tour performance, and about a hundred reporters. In particular, Rueng Lao Chao Nee of Thai terrestrial TV Channel 3, Channel 7, and Channel 9, and national broadcaster NBT visited the conference room and competed for coverage. In addition, many of the influential daily newspapers such as Thairath, Daily News, Naewna, and Manager Daily, which are called as the most influential newspapers in the country, participated and showed off the power of the global trend.

On June 22, the group's agency Starship Entertainment announced that the group member Wonho will not be attending the concert in Malaysia due to the lost of his passport and could not enter Malaysia.

Australia
It was Monsta X's first time to have a world tour in Australia. They performed at ICC Sydney Theater in Sydney on June 5 and at Margaret Court Arena in Melbourne on June 8.

Europe
After the tour in Australia, the group headed to Europe. Starting with the concert held at Palacio Vistalegre in Madrid on June 29, Monsta X performed at AFAS Live in Amsterdam on July 3, La Seine Musicale in Paris on July 6, SSE Arena Wembley in London on July 9, and ending it at Mercedes-Benz Arena in Berlin on July 13.

In Europe, the concert brought the group media attention, including attending and performing on a famous local morning TV show Good Morning Britain.

Americas
Monsta X held the tour around the United States of America which started on July 25 at Verizon Theatre in Dallas and ended on August 10 at Staples Center in Los Angeles. During their stay, they had sold-out shows and interviews, with local and nationwide TV programs, such as Good Morning America and Jimmy Kimmel Live!, broadcast on ABC, magazines such as Billboard, Forbes, and Chicago Tribune, which are all influential media outlets in the United States, as well as internet and radio shows such as 102.3 KIIS-FM's Jojo on the Radio and iHeartRadio's affiliated channels.

Critical reception
Sarah Deen of Metro gave them  and described the tour as "upgraded show that was part concert and part rave", all fierce but with what felt like "a new-found confidence". Deen also commended their more "mature and experimental sound" that brought life into their stages.

Commercial performance
The tour gathered 40,029 attendees, with a gross sales of $4,568,966 for seven reported shows out of twenty-three total shows.

Impact
Monsta X, which proved its popularity by predicting live broadcasts of performances at the Staples Center, where world-class stars took the stage, has been performing dazzlingly, capturing the hearts of fans around the world through various activities on Naver V Live. In particular, the Staples Center is where the American Grammy Awards, one of the three major music awards in the United States, are held every year, and it is famous as the place where artists loved around the world, such as Beyoncé, Taylor Swift, Ed Sheeran, and BTS performed. Monsta X also became the twelfth Asian artist in history to gross over $1,000,000 for one show in North America.

Monsta X also became the first K-pop artist to appear on a live broadcast of the morning news program Good Morning Britain, of the British ITV channel, drawing the attention of global fans.

Monsta X was the first Korean artist to participate and appeared in the popular American animation We Bare Bears, and this episode was made through communication between Daniel Chong and their fans club. In particular, through the broadcast, the group directly dubbed English with their own voices, adding a sense of reality to the sitcom, which was broadcast in about 200 countries around the world, which received a lot of attention from fans around the world as well as local fans.

Setlist

INTRO VCR
 "Shoot Out"                                                                         
 "Hero"                                                                                      
 "Trespass" 
MENT                                                                                                                                           
 "Party Time"                                                                         
 "Play It Cool"
MENT                                                                                     
 "Miss You"                                                                                               
 "Mohae"                                              
 "Jealousy"  
VCR                                                                                                                                                         
 "Myself" of Bazzi – Minhyuk, Kihyun, and Hyungwon                 
 "SamBakJa" (Triple Rhythm) – Joohoney and I.M                                               
 "Mirror" – Shownu and Wonho                                         
MENT 
 "Honestly"
 "I'll Be There"  
 "I Do Love U"
 "White Sugar"

       
MENT                                                               
 "No Reason" 
VCR
 "Myself"
 "Who Do U Love?"
 "Dramarama"
 "Spotlight"
MENT
 "Oh My"
 "Special"
 "Fallin'"
MENT 
 "Alligator"
 DJ H.One Stage Set
 "Rodeo" 
ENDING MENT
 "By My Side"

Notes:
 included in the Seoul setlist only
 included in the International setlist only
Japan had a different setlist which included Japanese songs

Tour dates

Boxscore

References

External links
  

Monsta X concert tours
2019 concert tours
K-pop concerts
Concert tours of Asia
Concert tours of Japan
Concert tours of Malaysia
Concert tours of Mexico
Concert tours of North America
Concert tours of South Korea
Concert tours of Thailand
Concert tours of the United States